Versão Acústica is a Brazilian Acoustic rock band formed by Emmerson Nogueira. The band performs with him on stage and on studio for the release of his albums and DVDs.

Members 
 Emmerson Nogueira – Lead vocals, acoustic guitar
Marcos Falcão – Acoustic guitar, twelve string guitar, mandolin, lapsteel
Fabinho Ferreira – Bass
Zé Mario – drums
Felipe Grillo – Piano, synthesizer,  organ, backing vocals
Luciano Baptista – Harmonica, acoustic guitar, percussion, backing vocals, transverse flute
Carol Marques – Lead vocals, backing vocals
Vanessa Farias – Lead vocals, backing vocals

Former members 
Luciano Mendonca - Bass guitar
Sara Furtado - Lead vocals

Discography 
 Versão Acústica – 2001
 Versão Acústica 2 – 2002
 Versão Acústica 3 – 2003
 Emmerson Nogueira Ao Vivo – 2003
 Emmerson Nogueira - Beatles – 2004
 Miltons, Minas e Mais – 2005

External links
 Official Site 
 Official Fan-Club 
 Emmerson Nogueira and his band at Sony BGM Brasil 

Brazilian rock music groups
Musical groups established in 2000
2000 establishments in Brazil